Jafarabad (Sindhi: جعفرآباد ضلعو) district lies in southeast of the Pakistani province of Balochistan. Jafarabad's headquarters are at Dera Allah Yar, also known as Jhatpat among locals.  Jaffarabad District is sub-divided into two tehsils. The main tribes of this district are: Hanbhi, Jamali, Umrani, Khoso, Bulledi, Magsi, Babbar, and Behrani, while internally displaced people of Bugti tribes also live in Jafarabad. Other minority communities are Gola, Lashari, and Domki. Recently in 2022 part of it was split off to form the new district of Usta Muhammad.

Demographics

At the time of the 2017 census the district had a population of 253,107, of which 80,958 (31.99%) lived in urban areas. Jafarabad had a sex ratio of 947 females per 1000 males and a literacy rate of 31.87% - 43.87% for males and 19.47% for females. 97,696 (38.60%) were under 10 years of age.

At the time of the 2017 census, 57.31% of the population spoke Balochi, 14.75% Sindhi, 14.30% Brahui and 11.62% Saraiki as their first language.

Administration
The district of Jaffarabad is administratively subdivided into the following three Tehsils:
 Jafarabad 
 Jhat Pat (Dera Allah Yar)

Education 
According to the Pakistan District Education Rankings 2017, district Jafarabad is ranked at number 113 out of the 141 ranked districts in Pakistan on the Education Score index. This index considers learning, gender parity and retention in the district.

Literacy rate in 2014–15 of population 10 years and older in the district stood at 36% whereas for females it was only 15%.

Post primary access is a major issue in the district with 89% schools being at primary level. Compared with high schools which only constitute 4% of government schools in the district. This is also reflected in the enrolment figures with 27,448 students enrolled in class 1 to 5 and only 736 students enrolled in class 9 and 10.

Gender disparity is another issue in the district. Only 28% schools in the district are girls’ schools. Access to education for girls is a major issue in the district and is also reflected in the low literacy rates for females.

Moreover, the schools in the district lack basic facilities. According to Alif Ailaan Pakistan District Education Rankings 2017, the district is ranked at number 117 out of the 155 districts of Pakistan for primary school infrastructure. At the middle school level, it is ranked at number 116 out of the 155 districts. These rankings take into account the basic facilities available in schools including drinking water, working toilet, availability of electricity, existence of a boundary wall and general building condition. More than 3 out of 5 schools in the district lack electricity, working toilet and a boundary wall. More than 1 out of 5 schools do not have clean drinking water.

The main issues reported in Taleem Do! App for the district are unavailability of class rooms for students and a lack of university. Political interference is also reported in development of new schools.

Notes

References

Citations

Sources

External links

 Jaffarabad District at www.balochistan.gov.pk
 District Jaffarabad  at www.balochistanpolice.gov.pk

 
Districts of Pakistan
Districts of Balochistan, Pakistan